Gail Brodholt is an English artist known primarily for her oil paintings and linocut prints. She lives in Beckenham and works in Woolwich, both in South East London.

Background 
Brodholt studied at the School of Fine Art at Kingston University. She was elected an associate of the Royal Society of Painter Printmakers (RE) in 2006 and a Fellow in 2009 and was appointed Honorary Curator in 2013.

Work 
Brodholt's work is concerned with London and in particular its trains and Underground. She uses vivid colours and strong shapes which give a graphical quality to her work. She has exhibited widely in London and across the UK. Her technique has been described in detail in the book Printmakers' Secrets and the book Still Life.

Brodholt's work is also displayed at the London Transport Museum, and was part of an art installation at Blackfriars Station in 2009.

Awards 
Brodholt was awarded the 2018 Printfest Printmaker of the Year title.

References

External links 
 Official website

English artists
Year of birth missing (living people)
Living people
Alumni of Kingston University